Michael Mak may refer to:
 Michael Mak (politician), Hong Kong politician
 Michael Mak (director), Hong Kong film director